The Lyons VA Medical Center is a United States Department of Veterans Affairs hospital complex located at 151 Knollcroft Road in the Lyons section of Bernards Township in Somerset County, New Jersey. Established in 1930, it is part of the VA New Jersey Health Care System. Listed as the Lyons Veterans Administration Hospital Historic District, it was added to the National Register of Historic Places on July 3, 2013, for its significance in architecture, health/medicine, and politics/government.

History
Funding for the medical center was first provided by the World War Veterans Act of 1924. The  estate of Walter
E. Reynolds, known as Knollcroft, was purchased in November 1928. Construction began in June 1929. The first patients were admitted in November 1930. The facility was dedicated on July 25, 1931.

Historic district
The Lyons Veterans Administration Hospital Historic District is a  historic district encompassing the medical center campus. It was listed as part of the United States Second Generation Veterans Hospitals Multiple Property Submission (MPS). The district includes 31 contributing buildings and 3 other contributing properties. The Main Building was completed in 1930 and features Classical Revival architecture, with six Corinthian pilasters, decorated pediment, and domed cupola. The flagpole in front of the building is a contributing object.

See also
 National Register of Historic Places listings in Somerset County, New Jersey
 List of Veterans Affairs medical facilities by state
 East Orange VA Medical Center – second VA hospital in New Jersey

References

External links

Bernards Township, New Jersey
Veterans Affairs medical facilities
1930 establishments in New Jersey
Hospital buildings completed in 1930
Buildings and structures in Somerset County, New Jersey
Neoclassical architecture in New Jersey
National Register of Historic Places in Somerset County, New Jersey
Hospital buildings on the National Register of Historic Places in New Jersey
Historic districts on the National Register of Historic Places in New Jersey
New Jersey Register of Historic Places